Team Betta Electrical may refer to these teams which competed in V8 Supercars with Betta Electrical as their title sponsor:

John Faulkner Racing: 1996 - 1998
Briggs Motor Sport: 2002 - 2003
Paul Weel Racing: 2002
Triple Eight Race Engineering: 2004 - 2006